Aphonopelma icenoglei is a species of spiders in the family Theraphosidae, found in United States (California).

References

icenoglei
Spiders described in 2016
Spiders of the United States
Endemic fauna of California
Fauna without expected TNC conservation status